Joseph "Josef" or "Sepp" Benz (20 May 1944 – 5 February 2021) was a Swiss bobsledder who competed from the mid-1970s to the early 1980s. Competing in two Winter Olympics, he won four medals with one gold (Two-man: 1980), two silvers (Four-man: 1976, 1980), and one bronze (Two-man: 1976).

Career
Benz, who was born in Zurich, won eight medals at the FIBT World Championships with three golds (Two-man: 1978, 1979; Four-man: 1981), two silvers (Four-man: 1977, 1978), and three bronzes (Two-man: 1981, Four-man: 1979, 1981).

In 2008, he was named chairman of the Sport Commission for artificial track luge for the International Luge Federation (FIL). Benz also was a postal clerk in his native Switzerland. He served as chairman of the FIL Youth Commission before serving as chairman of the Sport Commission from 2008 to 2014. During his tenure in Artificial track, Benz created the team relay event that was first held at the 2008 world championships and became an event at the 2014 Winter Olympics.

Death
Benz died from COVID-19 on 5 February 2021, at age 76, during the COVID-19 pandemic in Switzerland.

References

External links
 Bobsleigh two-man Olympic medalists 1932-56 and since 1964
 Bobsleigh four-man Olympic medalists for 1924, 1932-56, and since 1964
 Bobsleigh two-man world championship medalists since 1931
 Bobsleigh four-man world championship medalists since 1930
 
 FIL-Luge.org June 20, 2008 article on Benz's selection as FIL chairman of the artificial track sport commission - accessed 27 June 2008.
 FIL-Luge listing of Benz's 5 February 2021 death. - accessed 6 February 2021
 IBSF listing of Benz's 5 February 2021 death. - accessed 6 February 2021.
 
 

1944 births
2021 deaths
Sportspeople from Zürich
Swiss male bobsledders
Swiss referees and umpires
Olympic bobsledders of Switzerland
Olympic medalists in bobsleigh
Olympic gold medalists for Switzerland
Olympic silver medalists for Switzerland
Olympic bronze medalists for Switzerland
Bobsledders at the 1976 Winter Olympics
Bobsledders at the 1980 Winter Olympics
Medalists at the 1976 Winter Olympics
Medalists at the 1980 Winter Olympics
Deaths from the COVID-19 pandemic in Switzerland
20th-century Swiss people